Backpackers is a Canadian comedy web series, which aired in 2013 on CTV.ca and CW Seed. The CW picked up the series for television broadcast, for which material from the web series was edited into four half-hour episodes, and six new episodes were produced. Backpackers made its television premiere on July 14, 2014. The series stars Dillon Casey and Noah Reid as Brandon and Ryan, two friends on a backpacking trip across Europe after Ryan and his girlfriend Beth (Meghan Heffern) experience cold feet over their pending engagement. Ryan's stolen journal is posted on the Internet and goes viral, sending Ryan, Brandon, and Brandon's brother Andrew (Giacomo Gianniotti) on another journey, to recover the journal and fulfill Ryan's dream of becoming a published author.

The web series was produced by Smokebomb Entertainment, the digital content division of Shaftesbury Films. The television series is produced by Shaftesbury U.S. and Smokebomb in association with The CW.

Casey garnered a Canadian Screen Award nomination for Performance in a Program or Series Produced for Digital Media at the 2nd Canadian Screen Awards.

On July 23, 2014, The CW removed Backpackers from its schedule after just two episodes, and released the remaining episode on CW Seed.

Webisodes

Season 1
Eight webisodes were released on the CTV website, as well as CW Seed, in 2013.

Season 2
In 2015, The CW began releasing episodes for a second season on CW Seed. The 6 episodes filmed for television were split into 24 webisodes.

Television episodes

The television episodes each consist of two webisodes merged.

References

External links

CTV Television Network original programming
Canadian comedy web series
Television series by Shaftesbury Films
The CW original programming
2013 web series debuts
2015 web series endings